Qaleh-ye Asghar Khan (also Romanized as Qal‘eh-ye Aşghar Khān) is a village in Sanjabi Rural District, Kuzaran District, Kermanshah County, Kermanshah Province, Iran. At the 2006 census, its population was 28, in 7 families.

References 

Populated places in Kermanshah County